Timothy "Tim" McIntyre (born 9 April 1989) is an Australian rules footballer who played for the Adelaide Football Club in the Australian Football League (AFL). He was recruited by the club in the 2012 Rookie Draft, with pick #41. McIntyre made his debut in round 15, 2012, against  at AAMI Stadium in Showdown XXXIII.

References

External links

1989 births
Living people
Adelaide Football Club players
Sturt Football Club players
Australian rules footballers from South Australia